Artemesia is the second studio album by the Dutch progressive metal band Sun Caged, released on March 23, 2007 by Lion Music. The album features the band's current lineup, which has steadied after many replacements during the years of their productions. The Japanese version of the album features a cover song; "Land of Confusion" by progressive rock band Genesis.

Track listing 
 "Lyre's Harmony" − 7:22
 "A Fair Trade" − 6:26
 "Unborn" − 6:27
 "Blood Lines" − 9:30
 "Painted Eyes" − 4:26
 "Engelbert the Inchworm" − 4:36
 "Afraid to Fly" − 7:09
 "Dialogue" − 8:24
 "Departing Words" − 8:05
 "Doldrums" − 7:32
 "Land of Confusion" (Genesis cover) −  (Bonus track for Japan)

Credits

Band members 
 Paul Adrian Villarreal − vocals, acoustic guitar
 Marcel Coenen − lead guitar, rhythm guitar
 Rene Kroon − keyboards
 Roel Vink − bass
 Roel van Helden − drums and percussion

Guest musicians 
 Barend Tromp − (Fretless) bass on "A Fair Trade" and "Afraid to Fly", additional fretless bass parts on "Doldrums", Sitar on "Departing Words".

Other 
Production
 Keyboards were recorded at Rene's home studio.
 Mixed by Marcel, Hans and Rene.
 Mastered by Marcel and Hans.
 All music written by Sun Caged, except "Engelbert", written by Sun Caged and Rob Van Der Loo.
 All lyrics by Paul Adrian Villarreal.
 Artwork by Jeroen Evers on www.porcupine.nl.
 Photographs by Wim Van Het Hof.

Miscellaneous
 Nick Hameury − voice of Engelbert
 Lee Loveless − voice on "Blood Lines"
 Amanda Loveless − voice on "Departing Words"

References

Sun Caged albums
2007 albums